Renegades is the fourth and most recent studio  album by American rock band Rage Against the Machine (RATM), released on December 5, 2000, by Epic Records, almost two months after their first breakup. The album consists of covers of songs by Bruce Springsteen, Bob Dylan, Afrika Bambaataa, Minor Threat, Eric B. & Rakim, The Stooges, MC5, The Rolling Stones, Cypress Hill, Devo, and others.

Renegades is RATM's only album not to be accompanied by a supporting tour. Shortly after the release of the album, three of the four band members (minus vocalist Zack de la Rocha) formed a new band, Audioslave, with former Soundgarden vocalist/guitarist Chris Cornell. RATM did, however, release the live album Live at the Grand Olympic Auditorium in 2003, consisting of their final two concerts before their initial break-up.

The album achieved platinum status a little over a month after its initial release.

Artwork

The album's cover art is a tribute to the pop art work LOVE by Robert Indiana, with the word "love" replaced with "rage" and the letter G at the bottom left corner slanted (in the original sculpture, the slanted letter O is at the top right corner). The album shipped with four different versions of the cover: either red lettering with black and either blue or green background, or with the red and black switched. The album's packaging also includes a poem by Josh Koppel. The artwork ends with a photograph of an American one dollar bill with the message "You are not a slave" written on the back.

Critical reception

Renegades received positive reviews from music critics. At Metacritic, which assigns a normalized rating out of 100 to reviews from mainstream critics, the album has an average score of 78 based on 26 reviews, indicating "generally favorable reviews". AllMusic critic John Bush wrote that the record "works well with just a bare few exceptions, in part because Rage Against the Machine is both smart enough to change very little and talented enough to make the songs its own." Alternative Press described the record as "a tour through three decades of sonic recalcitrance" and "the genome map of seditious sound". Entertainment Weeklys Rob Brunner described the record's sound as "a remarkably diverse, if not exactly surprising, mix of heavy rock, hip hop and protest music", while remarking that it "would still be a raging success even if this disc does nothing but introduce a new generation to the joys of Bob Dylan and Minor Threat."

On Renegades, Mojo has remarked: "This crisp, Rick Rubin-produced outing packs away a machine that was well-oiled to the last." Kitty Empire of NME labeled the record as "a brilliant archaeology" and "a sonic history lesson". Rolling Stone critic Tom Moon believed that the band executed "diverse tracks" such as Bruce Springsteen's "The Ghost of Tom Joad", the Rolling Stones' "Street Fighting Man", Afrika Bambaataa's "Renegades of Funk" and Bob Dylan's "Maggie's Farm" with "the roaring, fearless spirit that’s been missing in action since these songs were new", while Select regarded it as the band's "most satisfying record since their debut".

Track listing

Best Buy limited edition

Limited edition albums sold at Best Buy contained a bonus disc with live recordings of "People of the Sun" and "No Shelter". The songs were later released as part of Live at the Grand Olympic Auditorium in 2003, as was "Kick Out the Jams (live)".

Personnel

Rage Against the Machine – co-producer, art direction
Zack de la Rocha – vocals
Tom Morello – guitar
Tim Commerford (credited as "tim.com") – bass/backing vocals
Brad Wilk – drums
Sen Dog – vocals on the live version of "How I Could Just Kill a Man"
B-Real – vocals on the live version of "How I Could Just Kill a Man"
Rick Rubin – producer
Brendan O'Brien – producer of "The Ghost of Tom Joad"
Jim Scott – engineer
David Schiffman – engineer
Rich Costey – mixing
D. Sardy – mixing of "The Ghost of Tom Joad" and "Street Fighting Man"
Katie Teasdale – assistant engineer
Darren Mora – assistant engineer
Matt Marin – assistant engineer
Mike Scotella – assistant engineer
Geoof Walcha – assistant engineer
Rich Veltrop – assistant engineer
Greg Fidelman – digital editing
Mark Moreau – digital editing
Aimee Macauley – art director
Lindsay Chase – production coordination
Jake Sexton – political coordinator
Jake Koppell – inside booklet

Charts

Weekly charts

Year-end charts

Certifications

References

External links

 

2000 albums
Albums produced by Brendan O'Brien (record producer)
Albums produced by Rick Rubin
Covers albums
Epic Records albums
Rage Against the Machine albums